Herbert Neesam (2 June 1892 – 6 July 1969) was an English professional footballer who played as a right half, making 281 appearances in the Football League for Bristol City in the years before and after the First World War.

References

1892 births
1969 deaths
People from Brompton, Scarborough
English footballers
English Football League players
Northern Football League players
Southern Football League players
Bath City F.C. players
Bristol City F.C. players
Association football wing halves
Footballers from North Yorkshire
Sportspeople from Scarborough, North Yorkshire